Nikos Athanasou (born in 1953) is a short story writer and novelist and musculoskeletal pathologist and scientist. He was born in Perth and grew up in Sydney where he studied medicine. He moved to England and is currently Professor of Musculoskeletal Pathology at Oxford University and a Fellow of Wadham College.

Short story writer and novelist 
His collection of twenty short stories Hybrids was published in 1995. These character-based short stories dealt with the sense of dislocation felt by Greek Australians and Greeks in Australia who see themselves as neither wholly Greek nor Australian but as a specific hybrid formed by the influence of these two cultures. Greek traditions sit uneasily in the new world society of Australia and contrarily, Australian attitudes and outlook clash with the social customs and attitudes of Greeks.

His second work, The Greek Liar, a novel  was published in 2002.  It further examines Greek Australian society and explores in greater depth the effect of rigid Greek and Australian social structures and the pursuit of materialistic goals on the individual Greek-Australian’s quest for identity.

His second novel The Person of the Man, published in 2012, continues this existential theme, examining the logical basis and feelings underlying an outwardly successful but secretly flawed marriage.  The betrayal and tragedy that follow show that love cannot be analysed in personal materialistic terms: it can only be understood.

His third novel Palindrome, published in 2016 is a cerebral crime novel set in the none too virtuous world of modern Oxford town and gown.

Musculoskeletal pathologist and scientist 
As Nicholas Athanasou he has written widely on bone, joint and soft tissue pathology and on the pathobiology of osteoarticular cells and tissues. With TJ Chambers he developed the osteoclast lacunar bone resorption assay system. His work was the first to show that the human osteoclast shares specific surface antigens with macrophages and that the mononuclear human osteoclast precursor circulates in the (CD14+) monocyte fraction. This led to the discovery of cellular and molecular mechanisms of pathological bone resorption associated with primary and secondary bone tumours, particularly breast cancer metastasis, Ewing sarcoma and giant cell–rich lesions such as giant cell tumour of bone and pigmented villonodular synovitis. In addition, his work has studied synovial and inflammatory macrophages and their role in osteoarthritis, rheumatoid arthritis, infection and Paget disease. His work on hip and knee implants focused on the importance of biomaterial wear particles on promoting osteoclast formation, osteolysis and implant loosening. He also characterised inflammatory criteria for the histological diagnosis of infection using frozen section procedure and was the first to provide a pathological description of pseudotumors associated with metal on metal hip implants.

Sources

1953 births
Living people
Australian pathologists
Australian people of Greek descent
Writers from Perth, Western Australia
University of Sydney alumni
Fellows of Wadham College, Oxford